James Coleman is a New Zealand television presenter, radio host and actor.

Radio

Coleman first become prominent in radio broadcasting during his time on the now-defunct alternative rock station Channel Z. Following the station's demise he has worked on Kiwi FM, and was previously a regular host on Radio Live.

Television

Coleman was the first host of TV3's Breakfast television show Sunrise. After poor ratings, Coleman resigned and was replaced by Oliver Driver. The show was subsequently cancelled.

He also starred as a fictionalized version of himself in Series 2 of The Jaquie Brown Diaries.

Most recently, Coleman was the host of Bigger, Better, Faster, Stronger, which was nominated for an Aotearoa Film and Television Award.

Film
In 2001, Coleman acted in local film Stickmen.

See also
 List of New Zealand television personalities

References

External links
 
 Bigger Better Faster Stronger Homepage
 Interview with James Coleman for ScreenTalk, on NZ On Screen

New Zealand male television actors
New Zealand television presenters
1968 births
Living people
Radio Live